Lata Mountain is the summit of the island of Taʻū in the Manuʻa Islands. The summit of Lata Mountain the highest point in American Samoa.

See also
List of mountain peaks of the United States
List of U.S. states and territories by elevation

References 

Mountains of American Samoa
Volcanoes of American Samoa
Highest points of United States national parks